is a Japanese artist.

Hana Usui was born in Tokyo in 1974 and studied art history at Waseda University and Japanese calligraphy. In 2000, she moved to Vienna to start a career as a visual artists and then primarily worked in Berlin. Since 2011, Hana Usui has lived and worked in Vienna  and Bolzano-Bozen in Italy. Her drawings are made of black or white oil paint, which she carves into paper with a screwdriver and often embeds into ink washes.

"The works of the Japanese artist Hana Usui, who was born in Tokyo in 1974, are, however restrained, of great complexity. This is true of the relationship of oil drawing and ink painting (or photography), of the combination of drawing and painting techniques, of linear conciseness and spaciousness. The resulting richness of levels of expression also characterises the critical works that have dominated in recent years. Those on the history of her own country, on Fukushima or Hiroshima, give the subject a new dimension by avoiding anything striking or the purely documentary and are never to be seen as a political manifesto. Thanks to this distancing and mere suggestion and the symbolic in the artistic media, they gain, one might say, in quiet intensity and at the same time remain open to questions. In this way, freed of their historical context, warning and appeal demonstrate their enduring validity."

Selected solo exhibitions
 2019 Vienna Art Week: Bei Uns (Around Here), WOP – Works on Paper, Vienna / AT
 2018 An das Leben (To Life), Artcurial Austria, Vienna / AT
 2018 Black End, Galerie Dittmar, Berlin / DE
 2016 High & Slow, with Thilo Westermann, Kunsthaus Kaufbeuren / DE
 2015 Schwarzer Regen (Black Rain), Bildraum 01, Vienna / AT
 2015 Hana Usui – Works on Paper, Galerie Dittmar, Berlin / DE
 2015 Hana Usui – Works on Paper, Galerie Daniela and Cora Hölzl – EY5, Düsseldorf / DE
 2013  Hana Usui – Drawings, Galerie Dittmar, Berlin / DE
 2012 Vienna Art Week: Hana Usui. Drawings on paper 2006–2012, Kunsthalle Wien Karlsplatz / AT (Presentation of catalogue and works)
 2009 Prace na papierze / Works on Paper,  Museum of Japanese Art and Technology Manggha, Krakau / PL
 2009 Eine Linie ist eine Linie (A line is a line), with Friederike Maltz, Essenheimer Kunstverein / DE
 2009 Works on Paper, Galerie Waidspeicher at Haus zum Güldenen Krönbacken, municipal gallery in Erfurt / DE
 2008 Von der japanischen Kalligrafie zur freien Kunst (From Japanese calligraphy to free art), Schwartzsche Villa, Kommunale Galerie in Berlin / DE
 2008 Open Art: Kiku, Galerie Lichtpunkt, Munich / DE
 2008 Kataru Sen – Disegno a cacciavite (Kataru Sen – Drawing with a screwdriver), 41 artecontemporanea, Turin / IT
 2007 Asien-Pazifik Wochen: Negativ (Negative), Galerie oko, Berlin / DE
 2006 Works on paper and objects, with Michel Sauer, Kunstkontor Rampoldt, Berlin / DE
 2005 Einsamkeit in Berlin (Loneliness in Berlin), Galerie oko, Berlin / DE
 2002 Kuso Galleria, Tokio / JP
 1998 Kuso Galleria, Tokio / JP

Selected group exhibitions
 2019 Japan Unlimited, frei_raum Q21 exhibition space Museumsquartier Wien / AT
 2019 Works from the Collection, City Museum of Rimini / IT
 2018 Show Me Your Wound, Dom Museum Wien / AT (bis 2019)
 2017 Works from the Collection of the Kupferstichkabinett, Kunsthalle Bremen / DE
 2017 Parallel Vienna (art fair): Parallel and concordant / AT
 2016 Drawing Biennal: Profili del mondo: L'umano paesaggio da Giudo Reni a Kiki Smith, FAR – Fabbrica Arte Rimini, City Museum of Rimini / IT
 2016 Parallel Vienna (art fair): Border Crossing / AT
 2015 Vienna Art Week: Perpetuum Mobile, Garage – KunstHausWien / AT
 2014 Salotto.Vienna Viennese Art Salon presented by MAK – Austrian Museum of Applied Arts / Contemporary Art, Ex Pescheria, ex Pescheria – Salone degli Incanti, Triest / IT (Presentation and performance with Casaluce Geiger)
 2014 Vienna Art Week: No more Fukushimas, Marcello Farabegoli Projects at Verein08, Vienna / AT
 2013 Contemporary Art and Calligraphy: At the Nexus of Painting and Writing, Seoul Arts Center / KR 
 2011 The Esprit of Gestures. Hans Hartung, Informel and Its Impact, Gut Altenkamp, Papenburg / DE 
 2010 The Esprit of Gestures. Hans Hartung, Informel and Its Impact,  Kupferstichkabinett – Staatliche Museen zu Berlin / DE
 2010 KAMI. Silence- Action. Japanese Contemporary Art on Paper,  Kupferstich-Kabinett – Staatliche Kunstsammlungen Dresden / DE
 2010 Art to GO II, Kommunale Galerie Berlin / DE
 2009 Sensai / Weiss – die Reinheit der Form in der japanischen Kunst (Sensai / White – the purity of form in Japanese art), Museum Residenzgalerie Salzburg / AT
 2008 Parallel event of Manifesta 7: the pix of signs, City Gallery of Bolzano-Bozen / IT
 2005 Japan Now, Manggha Center of Japanese Art and Technology – The National Museum in Krakow / JP
 1994–98 Tokio Metropolitan Art Museum / AT

Selected collections
 Akademie der bildenden Künste Wien – Kupferstichkabinett / AT
 Albertina, Vienna / AT
 Angermuseum Erfurt / DE
 Auswärtiges Amt der Bundesrepublik Deutschland
  Berlinische Galerie – State Museum of Modern Art, Photography & Architecture, Berlin / DE
 Dom Museum Wien – Otto Mauer Contemporary / AT
 Kommunale Galerie Berlin / DE
 Kunsthalle Bremen / DE
 Museo della Cittá di Rimini / IT
  Museum of Japanese Art and Technology Manggha, Krakow / PL
 Museum Kunstpalast, Düsseldorf / DE
 Museum der Moderne Salzburg / AT
 Neuer Berliner Kunstverein / DE
 Neue Nationalgalerie, Berlin / DE
  Staatliche Kunstsammlungen Dresden - Kupferstich-Kabinett / DE
  Staatliche Museen zu Berlin - Kupferstichkabinett / DE
 Zentral- und Landesbibliothek Berlin / DE

Selected bibliography
 
 
 
 
 
 
 
 
 
  And in: 
 
 
  And in:

References 

 Hana USUI, Ed. Galerie oko and Kunstkontor Rampoldt, Berlin, 2006
 Von der japanischen Kalligrafie zur freien Kunst: Arbeiten auf Papier von Hana Usui, Ed. Bezirksamt Steglitz-Zehlendorf, Berlin, 2008
 Hana Usui - Drawings on paper 2006-2012, Ed. Marcello Farabegoli, Vienna, 2012
 Hana Usui, Ed. Galerie Dittmar, Berlin, 2015
 High & Slow: Hana Usui - Thilo Westermann, Ed. Kunsthaus Kaufbeuren, Kaufbeuren, 2016
 Profili del mondo, Ed. City of Rimini, 2016
 Parallel & konkordant: Künstler- und Vermittler/innen in symbiotischen Lebensbeziehungen privat & publik, Ed. Marcello Farabegoli and Lucas Gehrmann, Vienna, 2017
 Hana Usui: Politische und sozialkritische Arbeiten 2014 - 2019 / Political and sociocritical works 2014 - 2019, Ed. Marcello Farabegoli Projects, Vienna, 2019

External links 
 Homepage of the artist
 Galerie Dittmar Berlin 
 fruehsorge contemporary drawings
 Marcello Farabegoli Projects

1974 births
Living people
20th-century Japanese women artists
21st-century Japanese women artists
Artists from Tokyo
Japanese contemporary artists
Waseda University alumni